|}

The Golden Miller Novices' Chase, currently known for sponsorship purposes as the Turners Novices' Chase, is a Grade One National Hunt chase in Great Britain which is open to horses aged five years or older. It is run on the New Course at Cheltenham over a distance of about 2 miles and 4 furlongs (2 miles 3 furlongs and 168 yards, or 3,976 metres), and during its running there are seventeen fences to be jumped. It is a race for novice chasers and it is scheduled to take place each year on the third day of the Cheltenham Festival in March.

The race was initially sponsored by Jewson and was established in 2011 as a new race at the Festival. Jewson had sponsored a handicap race for novice chasers from 2005 to 2010, the Jewson Novices' Handicap Chase, which was run on the third day of the Festival. Jewson transferred their sponsorship to this new race at the 2011 Festival which took the place of the Novices' Handicap Chase on the third day, while the handicap race was moved to become the final race on the opening day of the Festival and retitled the Centenary Novices' Handicap Chase. The Jewson Novices' Chase was upgraded to Grade One by the British Horseracing Board from its 2014 running. The race's registered unsponsored title is the Golden Miller Novices' Chase, although it has always been run under sponsored titles.

The race was sponsored by insurance brokers JLT from 2014 until 2019. The JLT group had already been associated with sponsorship of a festival race, having sponsored the Festival Trophy Handicap Chase since 2012.  The race was renamed the Marsh Novices' Chase from the 2020 renewal following the merger of JLT and Marsh. The transport company Turners took over the sponsorship from the 2022 running.

Records
Leading jockey (3 wins):
 Ruby Walsh – Vautour (2015), Black Hercules (2016), Yorkhill (2017)

Leading trainer (4 wins):
 Willie Mullins – Sir Des Champs (2012), Vautour (2015), Black Hercules (2016), Yorkhill (2017)

Winners

See also
Horse racing in Great Britain
List of British National Hunt races

References

 Racing Post:

Cheltenham Racecourse
National Hunt chases
National Hunt races in Great Britain
Recurring sporting events established in 2011
2011 establishments in England